Johann Vogel may refer to:

Johann Vogel (poet) (1589–1663), German poet and Lutheran minister
Johann Vogel (composer) (1756–1788), German composer
Johann Carl Vogel (1932–2012), South African physicist
Johannes Vogel (botanist) (born 1963), German botanist
Johann Vogel (footballer) (born 1977), Swiss footballer

See also
Vogel (surname)